Defending champion Mats Wilander defeated Kevin Curren in the final, 6–7(5–7), 6–4, 7–6(7–3), 6–2 to win the men's singles tennis title at the 1984 Australian Open.

Seeds
The seeded players are listed below. Mats Wilander is the champion; others show the round in which they were eliminated.

Qualifying

Draw

Finals

Section 1

Section 2

Section 3

Section 4

Section 5

Section 6

Section 7

Section 8

External links
 Association of Tennis Professionals (ATP) – 1984 Australian Open Men's Singles draw
 1984 Australian Open – Men's draws and results at the International Tennis Federation

Mens singles
Australian Open (tennis) by year – Men's singles